Timo Weß (born 2 July 1982) is a field hockey player from Germany, who was a member of the Men's National Team that won the bronze medal at the 2004 Summer Olympics in Athens, Greece, and gold at the 2008 and 2012 Summer Olympics. He was born in Moers, North Rhine-Westphalia.

The defender, who played for German club Crefelder HTC, made his international senior debut for the national team on February 26, 2001 in a friendly against India in Mumbai. As of December 18, 2005, Weß earned 137 caps for his native country, in which he scored 13 goals. Previously he played for HTC Uhlenhorst Mülheim. Since the Athens Olympics he was the captain of the Men's National Team. At the end of his international career, he had earned 252 caps.

International senior tournaments
 2002 – 10th World Cup, Kuala Lumpur (1st place)
 2002 – Champions Trophy, Cologne (2nd place)
 2003 – European Nations Cup, Barcelona (1st place)
 2004 – Summer Olympics, Athens (3rd place)
 2005 – European Nations Cup, Leipzig (3rd place)
 2005 – Champions Trophy, Chennai (4th place)
 2006 – Champions Trophy, Terrassa (2nd place)
 2006 – 11th World Cup, Mönchengladbach (1st place)
 2007 – European Nations Cup, Manchester (4th place)
 2007 – Champions Trophy, Kuala Lumpur (1st place)
 2008 – Summer Olympics, Beijing (1st place)
 2012 – Summer Olympics, London (1st place)

References

External links
 
Der ideale Kapitän Markus Wessel / WDR.de

1982 births
Living people
People from Moers
Sportspeople from Düsseldorf (region)
German male field hockey players
Male field hockey defenders
Olympic field hockey players of Germany
Olympic gold medalists for Germany
Olympic bronze medalists for Germany
2002 Men's Hockey World Cup players
Field hockey players at the 2004 Summer Olympics
2006 Men's Hockey World Cup players
Field hockey players at the 2008 Summer Olympics
Olympic medalists in field hockey
Field hockey players at the 2012 Summer Olympics
Medalists at the 2012 Summer Olympics
Medalists at the 2008 Summer Olympics
Medalists at the 2004 Summer Olympics
HTC Uhlenhorst Mülheim players
Rot-Weiss Köln players
21st-century German people